The village is located on the bottom of Erg Chebbi, a Saharan erg in southeast Morocco near the Algerian border.

The most well-known nearby village is Merzouga. Other villages around the dunes are Hassilabied, Tanamoust, Takoujt and Khamlia.

Populated places in Errachidia Province
Oases of Morocco